The AS.34 Kormoran (cormorant) is a German-produced anti-ship missile. The Kormoran uses an inertial guidance system for the midcourse phase, switching to active radar homing during the terminal attack phase. It carries a 165 kg (363 lb) delay-fused warhead, designed for 90mm of penetration prior to detonation. The maximum range is 23 km (~14 miles).

Design and development
Development of the Kormoran started in 1962, being taken over by Messerschmitt-Bölkow-Blohm (now a part of EADS) in 1967. The missile was originally designed for anti-shipping roles in coastal waters, although it retains a secondary land-attack capability as well. It was deployed on the Panavia Tornado. 350 Kormoran 1s were produced.

The AS.34 Kormoran 2 is an improved version of the AS.34 Kormoran 1. Development was started in 1983, with first flight and firing trials taking place in early 1986. The missile features an improved warhead, all-digital electronics, improved active radar seeker, increased ECM-resistance, a stronger booster rocket, a longer range, improved automated target selection, multiple launch capability, and an increased resistance to countermeasures.

While still using the same basic airframe as Kormoran 1, the Kormoran 2 has a greater range of 35 km (21.7 miles) and a heavier 220 kg (485 lb) warhead.

Testing ended in 1987, and the missile entered service with the German Navy in 1991. Approximately 140 missiles were produced for Germany.

Operators

Specifications

Name: AS.34 Kormoran 1/2
Weight: 600/630 kg
Length: 4,40 m
Range: 23/35 km
Warhead: 165/220 kg
Guidance: INS/active radar homing

External links

MissileThreat.com courtesy of The Claremont Institute, retrieved 2 August 2007
Federation of American Scientists entry, AS.34 Kormoran, retrieved 2 August 2007

Forecast International

Anti-ship missiles of Germany
Cold War weapons of Germany
Military equipment introduced in the 1970s